Shahe is a county-level city in the prefecture-level city of Xingtai, in the southern part of Hebei province, China.

Shahe has been called China's "glass capital." Its glass factories manufacture about ten percent of the world supply of flat glass. About 50,000 of Shahe's 480,000 residents work in the glass industry.

Smog in Shahe has become a serious problem, with some factories preferring to pay fines rather than comply with air pollution enforcement requirements.

Administrative divisions

Subdistricts:
Dalian Subdistrict, Qiaodong Subdistrict, Qiaoxi Subdistrict, Zanshan Subdistrict, Zhouzhuang Subdistrict

Towns:
Shahecheng, Xincheng, Baita, Shiliting, Qicun (綦村镇

Townships:
Liucun Township, Cejing Township, Liushigang Township, Chaiguan Township, Chanfang Township

Climate

References

External links

County-level cities in Hebei
Glass industry
Xingtai